Jochen Meißner (born 8 May 1943) was a leading single scull rower of West Germany between 1965 and 1972. In this event, he won national titles in 1965–1968 and a European title in 1965; a silver medal at the 1968 Summer Olympics, as well as bronze medals at the world (1966) and European (1969) championships. At the 1967 European Rowing Championships in Vichy, he came fourth in the single sculls. He also competed in the double sculls at the 1972 Summer Olympics, together with Arthur Heyne, and finished in tenth place.

References

External links
 

1943 births
Living people
Olympic rowers of West Germany
Rowers at the 1968 Summer Olympics
Rowers at the 1972 Summer Olympics
Olympic silver medalists for West Germany
Sportspeople from Stuttgart
Olympic medalists in rowing
West German male rowers
World Rowing Championships medalists for West Germany
Medalists at the 1968 Summer Olympics
European Rowing Championships medalists